Charles Stedman Garland (October 29, 1898 – January 28, 1971) was an American tennis player who won the 1920 Wimbledon men's doubles title with Richard Norris Williams. He reached the singles semi finals at Wimbledon in 1919 (losing to Algernon Kingscote) and 1920 (losing to Bill Tilden). His highest U.S. singles ranking was No. 8. He was inducted into the International Tennis Hall of Fame in 1969.

Garland won the US Intercollegiate Championships for Yale in 1919 and served as Vice President of the USLTA.  He was born in Pittsburgh.

Grand Slam finals

Doubles (1 title)

References

External links
 
 

American male tennis players
Tennis players from Pittsburgh
1898 births
1971 deaths
Grand Slam (tennis) champions in men's doubles
International Tennis Hall of Fame inductees
Wimbledon champions (pre-Open Era)